Benajuy-ye Sharqi Rural District is in the Central District of Bonab County, East Azerbaijan province, Iran. At the census of 2006, its population was 12,179 in 2,934 households; there were 11,955 inhabitants in 3,455 households at the following census of 2011; and in the most recent census of 2016, the population of the rural district was 10,290 in 3,300 households. The largest of its five villages was Khusheh Mehr, with 3,528 people.

References 

Bonab County

Rural Districts of East Azerbaijan Province

Populated places in East Azerbaijan Province

Populated places in Bonab County